Cesa is an Italian surname. Notable people with the surname include:

 Lorenzo Cesa (born 1951), Italian politician
 Maurizio Vitale Cesa (1945-1987), Italian entrepreneur and sportswear inventor
 Matteo Cesa (c. 1425 – after 1491), Italian late-gothic style artist
 Mirella Cesa (born 1984), Ecuadorian singer
 Nicolò Cesa-Bianchi (born 1963), Italian computer scientist and professor of computer science

See also 

 Cesa (disambiguation)

Italian-language surnames